Les Fleurs du Mal – Die Blumen des Bösen (French and ) is the ninth album by darkwave band Sopor Aeternus & the Ensemble of Shadows, and was released in 2007. Anna-Varney Cantodea has explained that the title is not a reference to Charles Baudelaire's 1857 collection of poetry of the same name, but that "it is related to Jean Genet's novel Notre Dame des Fleurs." A double vinyl edition and a CD boxed set were also released in limited quantities of 900 and 2,000 copies, respectively. The limited-edition pressings included a 40-page booklet of lyrics and illustrations, as well as a 112-page manga about the album.

"In der Palästra" received release as a DVD-single, and the album proper was introduced and promoted via a promotional video.

Track listing

"La Mort d'Arthur" is based on the German translation of a Swedish children's song, "Små grodorna" ("Die kleinen Frösche")

Personnel
 Naomi Koop: Violin
 Susannah Simmons: Violin
 Liz Hanks: Cello
 Miriam Hughes: Flute
 Andrew Piper: Clarinet
 Mike Davis: Oboe, cor anglais
 Doreena Gor: Bassoon
 Daniel Robson: Trumpet
 Fenton Bragg: Trombone
 Eugene de la Fontaine: Tuba
 Bert Eerie: Drums
 Terence Bat: Drums
 Choir of the Collegiate Church of St. Mary of Warwick: Vocals, backing vocals
 Anna-Varney Cantodea: Vocals, all other instruments and programming, Written lyrics and music

References

2007 albums
Sopor Aeternus and The Ensemble of Shadows albums